A step clamp is a type of serrated-edged clamp used in conjunction with step blocks in machining to fix an object in place during milling operations.

They are available from numerous manufacturers such as Dinli, Misumi, etc.

References

Clamps (tool)